Cardiff Bay Visitor Centre (known informally as "the Tube") was a piece of modern architecture designed by the architect Wil Alsop for Cardiff Bay, Wales, in 1990. It was finally dismantled in 2010. A panel of architectural experts has said the building "single-handedly put Cardiff on the architectural map".

Design and construction
Architect Wil Alsop was already involved in the development of the Cardiff Bay Barrage when asked, by the Cardiff Bay Development Corporation (CBDC), to design a visitors' centre. The building was completed during the Summer of 1990, located close to the Victorian Pierhead Building. It cost somewhere between £350,000 and £500,000 and was intended to last only five years.

The new building was in the shape of a long flattened tube, glazed at each end. Alsop liked to compare its shape to a disposable cigarette lighter. It was constructed using a series of oval steel ribs, clad with marine plywood and covered with external skin of PVC sheeting. Ripple-like slots were cut into the plywood, allowing dappled daylight into the interior. It was shortlisted for the Royal Institute of British Architects (RIBA) Building of the Year award (forerunner of the Stirling Prize).

The visitor centre was built to house an exhibition about the new Cardiff Bay development. In 1993 the building needed to be moved from its location east of the Pierhead Building. Rather than permanently dismantle it, the structure was put on the back of a low-loader truck and moved to another part of the Bay. It continued to house interactive exhibitions and a scale model of Cardiff.

Because of its distinctive shape, the visitor centre became known locally as 'The Tube'. In 2009 it was listed ninth in the Top Ten free attractions in Wales.

Cardiff Bay Visitor Centre was listed by a panel of experts as one of the Top 50 Buildings of the 1990s, saying the building had "single-handedly put Cardiff on the architectural map".

Later events

In 2006 the building's operators, Cardiff Initiative, ceased trading and The Tube closed for several weeks, reopening under the management of Cardiff Council.

The Tube was finally dismantled (and put into storage) in Autumn 2010 to make way for a new link road. "I'm surprised it's lasted this long," said original project architect John Lyall.The site is going to be the new home for the Museum of Military Medicine

Awards
 1991 – Royal Institute of British Architects (RIBA) Regional Award for Architecture.
 1992 – RIBA National Award for Architecture.

References

External links
 

Buildings and structures in Cardiff
Former buildings and structures in Wales
Will Alsop buildings
Buildings and structures completed in 1990
1990 establishments in Wales
Visitor centres in Wales